Tirio may refer to:

 Tirió people, an ethnic group of the Amazon
 Tirió language, a language of Brazil and Suriname
 Tirio language (New Guinea), a language of Papua
 Tirio languages, a family of Trans–New Guinea languages 
 Dave Tirio, American musician

Language and nationality disambiguation pages